Burgrabice  is a village in the administrative district of Gmina Głuchołazy, within Nysa County, Opole Voivodeship, in south-western Poland, close to the Czech border.

The village has a population of 750.

History
The village was mentioned as Burgravici in 1284, when it was part of fragmented Piast-ruled Poland. Later on, it was also part of Bohemia (Czechia), Prussia, and Germany. During World War II, the Germans operated the E566 forced labour subcamp of the Stalag VIII-B/344 prisoner-of-war camp in the village. After the defeat of Germany in the war, in 1945, the village became again part of Poland and its historic name was restored.

Transport
There is a train station in the village.
But no railroad

Notable residents
 Arthur von Briesen (1843–1920), lawyer, president of the Legal Aid Society

References

Villages in Nysa County